Lambda Draconis (λ Draconis, abbreviated Lam Dra, λ Dra), also named Giausar, is a solitary, orange-red star in the northern circumpolar constellation of Draco. It is visible to the naked eye with an apparent visual magnitude of +3.85. Based upon an annual parallax shift of 9.79 mas as seen from the Earth, the star is located around 333 light years from the Sun.

This is an evolved red giant star on the asymptotic giant branch with a stellar classification of M0III-IIIa Ca1. It is a suspected slow irregular variable with a periodicity of roughly 1,100 days. At the estimated distance of the star, this yields a physical size of about 53 times the radius of the Sun. It has an estimated 1.7 times the mass of the Sun and is radiating 834 times the solar luminosity from its photosphere at an effective temperature of 3,958 K.

Nomenclature 
λ Draconis (Latinised to Lambda Draconis) is the star's Bayer designation.

It bore the traditional name Giausar (also written as Gianfar, Giansar and Giauzar) and Juza. In 2016, the International Astronomical Union organized a Working Group on Star Names (WGSN) to catalogue and standardize proper names for stars. The WGSN approved the name Giausar for this star on February 1, 2017 and it is now so included in the List of IAU-approved Star Names.

Namesakes
USS Giansar (AK-111) was a United States Navy Crater class cargo ship named after the star.

References

M-type giants
Asymptotic-giant-branch stars
Semiregular variable stars
Suspected variables
Draco (constellation)
Draconis, Lambda
Durchmusterung objects
Draconis, 01
100029
056211
4434
Giausar